Isabella Cogswell (6 July 1819 – 6 December 1874) was born in Halifax, a daughter to Henry Hezekiah Cogswell and his wife.

Cogswell showed a business acumen that stood her in good stead in funding her philanthropic activities during her lifetime. A shrewd businesswoman, her business dealings helped fund a variety of causes within her native Nova Scotia. She is commemorated with a plaque in St. Paul's Church (Halifax).

References 

 

Canadian women in business
1819 births
1874 deaths